Saint Anthony Main refers to an area of buildings with multiple owners located on Main Street across from Saint Anthony Falls in the Nicollet Island/East Bank, Minneapolis section of Southeast, Minneapolis in the U.S. state of Minnesota. Commonly the area is associated with Northeast, Minneapolis as it is actually northeast of downtown on the east side of the Mississippi River. It opened as a festival marketplace in the 1980s.

The area underwent a resurgence during the condominium boom in the early 2000s with several condo projects built in and around the area. It is now home to a movie theater, four bars and restaurants, a small cafe, design firms, and a Segway tour operator.

Buildings and Sights 
Saint Anthony Main sits on the other side of Central Avenue from Riverplace, a housing and office complex. It fronts the river at Saint Anthony Falls, the only waterfall on the Mississippi River, and sits next to the Hennepin Island Hydroelectric Plant, host of the Water Power Park, which opened in Spring 2007.

Some of the buildings in the area date from the 1850s when the Village of Saint Anthony on the northeast side of the Mississippi River was still separate from Minneapolis itself.  Several are contributing properties to the Saint Anthony Falls Historic District:
 Pracna Building, 117 Main Street SE (1890, now Pracna on Main)
 Salisbury & Satterlee Company Complex, 201-205 and 219 Main Street SE (1885, now Vic's Dining and Tuggs)
 Upton Block/ Union Iron Works, 129 Main Street SE (1855)
 Martin and Morrison Block, 127-129 Main Street SE (1858)

There are newer buildings in the area such as Phoenix on the River and the Mill and Main apartments and the Stone Arch Apartments complexes. The Pillsbury A-Mill was renovated and converted into new apartments including the A-Mill Artist lofts.

References

External links 
 Riverplace office complex in Minneapolis MN
 Saint Anthony Main website
 www.StoneArchBridge.com
 www.StAnthonyFalls.com
 www.NicolletIsland.com
 Entourage Events Group website
 Minneapolis Event Centers website
 Photographs of area around Saint Anthony Main, from About.com
 Sold Down the River Article on Riverfront Development

Shopping malls in Minnesota
Buildings and structures in Minneapolis
Redeveloped ports and waterfronts in the United States
Shopping malls in Hennepin County, Minnesota
Historic district contributing properties in Minnesota
National Register of Historic Places in Hennepin County, Minnesota
Commercial buildings on the National Register of Historic Places in Minnesota